Birsel Vardarlı Demirmen (born Birsel Vardarlı on 12 July 1984) is a Turkish former basketball player. She is considered to be one of the best Turkish female basketball players.

Vardarlı Demirmen played thirteen seasons for Fenerbahçe, where she won twenty two trophies. She was also the captain of the team for seven seasons. After announcing retirement in June 2019, her number 7 was retired by Fenerbahçe in December 2019.

She made 243 appearances for the Turkey women's national basketball team. She won silver medal in EuroBasket 2011 and bronze in EuroBasket 2013 with the team.

Early life 
Vardarlı-Demirmen was born in Izmir. She has two siblings. After playing football, she started playing basketball at the age of 11. She moved from Izmir to Istanbul at the age of 16 to play for Migrosspor.

Professional career

Migrosspor 
Vardarlı-Demirmen started her professional career in Migrosspor and played there for 6 seasons. In her last season at Migrosspor, she contributed her team to play in the 2006 Turkish Cup final.

Fenerbahçe 
She signed with Fenerbahçe in the summer of 2006. After the 2011–12 season, Nevriye Yılmaz's contract expired and Vardarlı-Demirmen became the captain of Fenerbahçe. She played 675 games for Fenerbahçe in 13 seasons and won 22 trophies, including 10 Turkish Super League, 6 Turkish Cups and 6 Turkish Presidential Cups. She also played in the EuroLeague finals in 2013, 2014 and 2017.

Vardarlı-Demirmen announced her retirement in June 2019.

Personal life 
Birsel Vardarlı married Emre Demirmen in June 2014. The couple has a daughter named Lina.

Honors
  Turkish Super League
Winners (10): 2007, 2008, 2009, 2010, 2011, 2012, 2013, 2016, 2018, 2019
  Turkish Cup
Winners (6): 2007, 2008, 2009, 2015, 2016, 2019
  Turkish Presidential Cup
Winners (6): 2007, 2010, 2012, 2013, 2014, 2015

Turkey women's national team
 EuroBasket 2011: 
 EuroBasket 2013:

See also
Turkish women in sports

References

External links
 Birsel Vardarlı Demirmen at FIBA Basketball Archive

1984 births
Living people
Basketball players at the 2012 Summer Olympics
Basketball players at the 2016 Summer Olympics
Fenerbahçe women's basketball players
Migrosspor basketball players
Olympic basketball players of Turkey
Point guards
Shooting guards
Sportspeople from İzmir
Turkish women's basketball players